Chen Yibing (born 19 December 1984 in Tianjin) is a Chinese gymnast, a four-time world champion on still rings. Chen was part of the Chinese team that won the gold medal in the team event at the World Artistic Gymnastics Championships in 2006, 2007, 2010 and 2011 (no team competition in 2005 and 2009) and the Asian Games in 2006 and 2010. Since his international debut at the 2006 World Artistic Gymnastics Championships, he was almost unbeatable on his specialist event, still rings, except to his teammate Yan Mingyong in 2009 and the Brazilian Arthur Nabarrete Zanetti at the 2012 Summer Olympics. He became the 2006, 2007, 2010 and 2011 world champions on still rings.

Chinese gymnastics head coach Huang Yubin questioned Chen's position at the 2012 Summer Olympics,  He was quoted as saying that "because of the ugly behaviors of the judges, it has hurt Chinese Gymnast, as well as being a humiliation to this event." According to Xinhua News, Huang also called the night a "dark night in the history of gymnastics". H.

Chen was also a member of the 2008 Beijing Olympics team and won gold for China in men's team gymnastics as well as gold on the Rings. His still rings performance was described as 'perfect' and 'textbook-worthy', highly acclaimed for its precision and high level of difficulty.

He is a student at the Beijing Normal University, the present captain of the men's Chinese gymnastic team and currently has 8 world titles and 3 Olympics gold medals.

See also

 China at the 2012 Summer Olympics

References

External links
 
 

1984 births
Living people
Chinese male artistic gymnasts
Gymnasts at the 2008 Summer Olympics
Gymnasts at the 2012 Summer Olympics
Medalists at the World Artistic Gymnastics Championships
Olympic gold medalists for China
Olympic silver medalists for China
Olympic gymnasts of China
Gymnasts from Tianjin
World champion gymnasts
Place of birth missing (living people)
Olympic medalists in gymnastics
Beijing Normal University alumni
Medalists at the 2012 Summer Olympics
Medalists at the 2008 Summer Olympics
Asian Games medalists in gymnastics
Gymnasts at the 2006 Asian Games
Gymnasts at the 2010 Asian Games
Asian Games gold medalists for China
Medalists at the 2006 Asian Games
Medalists at the 2010 Asian Games
Universiade medalists in gymnastics
Universiade gold medalists for China
Medalists at the 2005 Summer Universiade
21st-century Chinese people